Christine Keshen (born February 6, 1978) is a Canadian curler from Invermere, British Columbia.

She played lead for Team Canada, skipped by Shannon Kleibrink at the 2006 Winter Olympics. Keshen joined the team in 2005, and helped them win the Canada Cup of Curling in 2005 and the 2005 Canadian Olympic Curling Trials. At the Olympics, Keshen had the best percentage of any female player at the games with 81% after round-robin play.

Keshen posed nude for Ana Arce's "Fire on Ice" 2007 Team Sponsorship Calendar to promote women's curling.

References

External links
 
 Christine Keshen on Real Champions

Curlers from Alberta
Curlers from British Columbia
Curlers at the 2006 Winter Olympics
Canadian women curlers
People from the Regional District of East Kootenay
1978 births
Living people
Olympic bronze medalists for Canada
Olympic curlers of Canada
Olympic medalists in curling
Medalists at the 2006 Winter Olympics
Continental Cup of Curling participants
Canada Cup (curling) participants